Ronald William "Ron" Riley  (born 14 September 1947) is a retired field hockey striker from Australia, who twice won the silver medal with the Men's National Team, first at the 1968 Summer Olympics in Mexico City and then eight years later, at the 1976 Summer Olympics in Montreal. He was educated at the St. Joseph's College, Nainital in India.

Riley was awarded the Medal of the Order of Australia in 1995 for service to hockey.

International tournaments
 1968 – Olympic Games, Mexico City (2nd)
 1972 – Olympic Games, Munich (5th)
 1976 – Olympic Games, Montreal (2nd)
 1980 – Champions Trophy, Karachi (3rd)
 1980 – Olympic Games, Moscow (DNC)

References

External links
 

1947 births
Living people
Place of birth missing (living people)
Australian male field hockey players
Olympic field hockey players of Australia
Olympic silver medalists for Australia
Olympic medalists in field hockey
Medalists at the 1968 Summer Olympics
Medalists at the 1976 Summer Olympics
Field hockey players at the 1968 Summer Olympics
Field hockey players at the 1972 Summer Olympics
Field hockey players at the 1976 Summer Olympics
Recipients of the Medal of the Order of Australia